Vladko Panayotov (Bulgarian: Владко Тодоров Панайотов) (born 7 May 1950, Pavlikeni) is a scholar and Bulgarian member of the European Parliament who sits on the committee for the Environment, Public Health and Food Safety. He is also a substitute for the Committee on Industry, Research and Energy. He is a member of the Movement for Rights and Freedoms party of Bulgaria and in the European Union he is part of the Group of the Alliance of Liberals and Democrats for Europe.

Early life
Prof. Vladko Panayotov was educated in Moscow and Sofia, and holds a Ph.D. His areas of study include mineral processing and chemical cybernetics. In 1975 he worked as an Engineer at the Central Institute on Complex Automatics in Sofia. Between 1975 and 1977 he carried out regular military service.

Inventions

Panayotov created an environmentally friendly technology which extracts non-ferrous metals from industrial waste (including copper, nickel and aluminum). This technology avoids the use of cyanides, acids and over non-environmentally friendly materials and reduces the amount of industrial waste produced.

Publications

Panayotov has published over 160 works including 26 inventions, 5 monographs (in Bulgarian and in English) and 4 textbooks.

References

Living people
1950 births
MEPs for Bulgaria 2007–2009
MEPs for Bulgaria 2009–2014
People from Pavlikeni